A list of films produced by the Israeli film industry in 1949.

1949 releases

See also
1949 in Israel

References

External links
 Israeli films of 1949 at the Internet Movie Database

Israeli
Film
1949